Ziziphus  is a genus of about 40 species of spiny shrubs and small trees in the buckthorn family, Rhamnaceae, distributed in the warm-temperate, subtropical and tropical regions of the world. The flowers are small, inconspicuous yellow-green.

Etymology
The generic name is derived via classical Latin from Hellenistic Greek, where it is presumed to have been borrowed from another language, perhaps from zizfum or zizafun, the Persian word for Z. lotus.

Ecology
Ziziphus species are used as food plants by the larvae of some Lepidoptera species including Bucculatrix zizyphella, which feeds exclusively on the genus, and Endoclita malabaricus.

Well known species includes Ziziphus jujuba (jujube), Ziziphus spina-christi from southwestern Asia, Ziziphus lotus from the Mediterranean region, and ber (Ziziphus mauritiana), which is found from western Africa to India. Ziziphus joazeiro grows in the Caatinga of Brazil. Ziziphus celata is listed as an endangered species in the United States.

The fruits are an important source for birds, which eat the whole fruit and regurgitate the seeds intact, expanding the seeds in the best conditions for germination (ornithochory). Secondly, seed dispersal is carried out by mammals or fishes. The fruit is energy-rich because of the large amount of sugar it contains. It is cultivated and eaten fresh, dry, and in jam. It is also added as a base in meals and in the manufacture of candy. The leaves can be either deciduous or evergreen depending on species, and are aromatic.

They are temperate or tropical plants, having a great range. They prefer locations with a high temperature coupled with humidity. They require a deep soil, fresh, soft, siliceous-calcareous nature or limestone-clay-silica-clay and subsurface permeable, with pH between 5.5 and 7.8. In excessively sandy or clay soils which may be affected by standing water, the plants do not grow well. Many species are very sensitive to drought, and if the land is excessively dry and of calcareous nature, they may resent the lack of moisture. At the slightest drought, premature fruit drop is frequent. Ziziphus has several relict species living in temperate areas. These species cannot endure the harsh winters of temperate continental climates.

The ecological requirements of the genus are mostly those of vigorous species with a great ability to propagate in conducive habitats. This genus is adapted mostly to high rainfall and humidity, but some species are deciduous, living in Mediterranean humid climate. The deciduous Ziziphus species lose all of their leaves for part of the year depending on variations in rainfall. In deciduous species in tropical, subtropical, and arid regions, leaf loss coincides with the dry season. They grow mostly in tropical forests but have also been found in stubbles, pastures, coastal ranges, tropical mountain areas, and wet to dry interior regions. The family is distributed throughout tropical and subtropical areas and in cloud forest.

The differences are ecological adaptations to different environments over a relatively dry-wet climate. Species in less humid environment are smaller or less robust, with less abundant and thinner foliage and have oleifera cells that produce trees with a more fragrant aroma.

Uses

In traditional Chinese medicine (TCM), suan zao ren (Ziziphus spinosa) is considered to be sweet and sour in taste, and neutral in action. It is believed to nourish the heart yin, augment the liver blood, and calm the spirit (TCM medical terms). It is used to treat irritability, insomnia and heart palpitations.

Mythology
The mythological lotus tree which occurs in Homer's Odyssey is often equated with Z. lotus, though the date palm is also a possible candidate.

Selected species 

 Ziziphus abyssinica Hochst. ex A.Rich. (Dry zones of tropical Africa)
 Ziziphus angolito Standl.
 Ziziphus apetala Hook.f. ex M.A.Lawson
 Ziziphus attopensis Pierre
 Ziziphus budhensis Bhattarai & Pathak (Central Nepal)
 Ziziphus cambodiana Pierre (Cambodia, Laos, Vietnam)
 Ziziphus celata Judd & Hall (Florida, USA)
 Ziziphus cotinifolia Reissek
 Ziziphus fungii Merr.
 Ziziphus funiculosa Buch.-Ham. ex M.A.Lawson
 Ziziphus guaranitica Malme
 Ziziphus havanensis Kunth
 Ziziphus horrida Roth
 Ziziphus hutchinsonii (Philippines)
 Ziziphus incurva Roxb.
 Ziziphus joazeiro Mart.
 Ziziphus jujuba Mill. – Jujube
 Ziziphus laui Merr.
 Ziziphus lotus  (L.) Lam. (Mediterranean region)
 Ziziphus mairei Dode
 Ziziphus mauritiana Lam. (Widespread through Old World tropics and subtropics)
 Ziziphus melastomoides Pittier
 Ziziphus mexicana Rose
 Ziziphus mistol Griseb. (Gran Chaco of South America)
 Ziziphus montana W.W.Smith
 Ziziphus mucronata Willd. – Buffalo Thorn (Southern Africa)
 Ziziphus napeca
 Ziziphus nummularia (Burm.f.) Wight & Arn. (Thar Desert of South Asia)
 Ziziphus obtusifolia (Hook. ex Torr. & A.Gray) A.Gray – Lotebush
 Ziziphus oenoplia (L.) Mill.
 Ziziphus oxyphylla Edgew.
 Ziziphus parryi Torr. – Parry's Jujube
 Ziziphus poilanei Tardieu
 Ziziphus platyphylla Reissek
 Ziziphus quadrilocularis F.Muell. (Northern Australia)
 Ziziphus robertsoniana
 Ziziphus rugosa
 Ziziphus saeri Pittier
 Ziziphus sativa Gaertn
 Ziziphus spina-christi (L.) Desf.
 Ziziphus talanai (Blanco) Merr. (Philippines)
 Ziziphus trinervia (Cav.) Poir.
 Ziziphus undulata Reissek
 Ziziphus vulgaris Lamarck – Hinap (Bulgaria)
 Ziziphus xiangchengensis Y.L.Chen & P.K.Chou
 Ziziphus xylopyrus (Retz.) Willd.

List sources:

Fossil species
 † Ziziphus hyperboreus Heer (Greenland, Eocene fossil)
 † Ziziphus wyomingianis Berry (Tipperary, Wind River Basin Wyoming, USA, Eocene fossil)
† = Extinct

Gallery

References

 
Rhamnaceae genera
Taxa named by Philip Miller